Mount View may refer to:

 Mount View, New South Wales, town in Australia
 Mount View, Taupo, neighbourhood of Taupo, on the North Island of New Zealand
 Mount View (Sheridan, Wyoming), United States, listed on the National Register of Historic Places

See also
Mount View High School (disambiguation)